Urban Trial Freestyle is a racing video game developed and published by Tate Interactive. The game was released for the PlayStation Vita, Nintendo 3DS, iOS, PC, and PlayStation 3.

Gameplay
Urban Trial Freestyle is a racing game.

Development and release

Inspiration for the game came from Julien Dupont, a Red Bull Racing athlete. Dupont himself worked closely with the developers to help get the look and feel right for the game.

Urban Trial Freestyle was first released for the PlayStation 3 and PlayStation Vita on the PlayStation Network on February 19, 2013. It was later added to the Nintendo 3DS's Nintendo eShop service on June 27. A Steam version of the game was released on September 18. Later versions for the iPhone and iPad on July 9, 2014.

Sequels

A sequel, Urban Trial Freestyle 2 was released exclusively on 3DS in Europe on March 30, 2017, in North America on April 20, 2017, and in Japan on May 17, 2017. A new installment, Urban Trial Playground was released on the Nintendo Switch in North America on April 5, 2018, in Europe on April 25, 2018, and in Japan on May 24, 2018. PC version released via Steam platform on April 5, 2019.

Reception

Urban Trial Freestyle received mixed reviews from critics across all platforms.

By April 2014, the game was one of the best-selling games for the PlayStation Network, ranking #10 for the PlayStation 3 and #3 for the Vita.

References

External links

2013 video games
IOS games
Motorcycle video games
Nintendo 3DS eShop games
PlayStation 3 games
PlayStation Network games
PlayStation Vita games
Racing video games
Video games developed in Poland
Windows games